Ruam Chit is a tambon (subdistrict) of Tha Pla District, in Uttaradit Province, Thailand. In 2018 it had a total population of 5,540 people.

History
The subdistrict was created effective September 14, 1976 by splitting off 2 administrative villages from Hat Ngio.

Administration

Central administration
The tambon is subdivided into 11 administrative villages (muban).

Local administration
The area of the subdistrict is shared by 2 local governments.
the subdistrict municipality (Thesaban Tambon) Ruam Chit (เทศบาลตำบลร่วมจิต)
the subdistrict administrative organization (SAO) Ruam Chit (องค์การบริหารส่วนตำบลร่วมจิต)

References

External links
Thaitambon.com on Ruam Chit

Tambon of Uttaradit province
Populated places in Uttaradit province